Eric George Bailey GC (14 October 1906 – 12 January 1945) was a sergeant with the New South Wales Police Force and a posthumous Australian recipient of the George Cross, the highest civil decoration for heroism in the United Kingdom and formerly in the Commonwealth.

Career 
Bailey had joined the Postmaster-General's Department at the age of 16. He joined the police on 16 March 1927, initially based at Sydney's No.4 Station. He later transferred to the station at The Rock, a small township about 20 miles from Wagga Wagga on 17 September 1928. In May 1929 he transferred to Gundagai, and then from May 1932 to April 1939 served successively at Narrandera, Deniliquin and Balranald. He was promoted to constable first class on 23 April 1938. On 20 April 1939 he moved, this time to Moruya, here he was highly commended for his part in the rescue of survivors from the fishing trawler, Dureenbee, which had been attacked by a Japanese submarine on 3 August 1942. He was transferred for the final time, to Blayney, just eight days before his death.

George Cross 
He was awarded the George Cross posthumously after being shot while on duty. The full citation was published in a supplement to the London Gazette of 25 October 1946 and read:

Personal life 
Bailey was survived by his wife Florence, daughter Doreen, and son John, who himself later became a police officer. Bailey is buried at Rookwood Cemetery, Sydney, grave no.1959, Section 8 Anglican.

Bailey was a cousin (first cousin, once removed) of Victoria Cross recipient Jack French.

References

1906 births
1946 deaths
Australian police officers killed in the line of duty
Australian recipients of the George Cross
Burials at Rookwood Cemetery
Deaths by firearm in New South Wales
Male murder victims
People from New England (New South Wales)